UFC on ESPN: Kattar vs. Emmett (also known as UFC on ESPN 37 and UFC Austin) was a mixed martial arts event produced by the Ultimate Fighting Championship that took place on June 18, 2022 at the Moody Center in Austin, Texas, United States.

Background
After Frank Erwin Center hosted all previous UFC visits to the city, the newly built Moody Center was the venue for this event.

A featherweight bout between Calvin Kattar and Josh Emmett headlined the event.

A middleweight bout between Phil Hawes and Deron Winn took place at the event. They were previously scheduled to meet at UFC on ESPN: Makhachev vs. Moisés and UFC Fight Night: Dern vs. Rodriguez, but Winn pulled out both times due to injuries.

Roman Dolidze and Kyle Daukaus were expected to meet in a middleweight bout at UFC Fight Night: Holloway vs. Rodríguez, but it was cancelled due to COVID-19 protocols related to Dolidze’s camp. They were rebooked for this event.

A middleweight bout between Julian Marquez and Wellington Turman was expected to take place at the event. However, Turman withdrew due to an orbital bone injury and was replaced by Gregory Rodrigues.

A lightweight bout between Joe Lauzon and former UFC Lightweight Championship challenger Donald Cerrone was rescheduled to this event. They were originally scheduled for UFC on ESPN: Font vs. Vera, but were moved to UFC 274 for unknown reasons. In turn, the bout was scrapped on the day of that event when Cerrone suffered from food poisoning. The bout was yet again scrapped the day of this event due to Lauzon suffering from leg cramping.

At the weigh-ins, Tony Kelley weighed in at 137.5 pounds, one and a half pounds over the bantamweight non-title fight limit. His bout proceeded at a catchweight and he was fined 20% of his individual purse, which went to his opponent Adrian Yanez.

Results

Bonus awards
The following fighters received $50,000 bonuses.
 Fight of the Night: Josh Emmett vs. Calvin Kattar
 Performance of the Night:  Kevin Holland, Joaquin Buckley, Gregory Rodrigues, Adrian Yanez, Jeremiah Wells, Ricardo Ramos, Cody Stamann, Phil Hawes, and Roman Dolidze

See also 

 List of UFC events
 List of current UFC fighters
 2022 in UFC

References 

UFC on ESPN
2022 in mixed martial arts
June 2022 sports events in the United States
Sports in Austin, Texas
2022 in sports in Texas